Creatine ( or ) is an organic compound with the nominal formula . It exists in various tautomers in solutions (among which are neutral form and various zwitterionic forms). Creatine is found in vertebrates where it facilitates recycling of adenosine triphosphate (ATP), primarily in muscle and brain tissue. Recycling is achieved by converting adenosine diphosphate (ADP) back to ATP via donation of phosphate groups. Creatine also acts as a buffer.

History
Creatine was first identified in 1832 when Michel Eugène Chevreul isolated it from the basified water-extract of skeletal muscle. He later named the crystallized precipitate after the Greek word for meat, κρέας (kreas). In 1928, creatine was shown to exist in equilibrium with creatinine. Studies in the 1920s showed that consumption of large amounts of creatine did not result in its excretion. This result pointed to the ability of the body to store creatine, which in turn suggested its use as a dietary supplement.

In 1912, Harvard University researchers Otto Folin and Willey Glover Denis found evidence that ingesting creatine can dramatically boost the creatine content of the muscle. In the late 1920s, after finding that the intramuscular stores of creatine can be increased by ingesting creatine in larger than normal amounts, scientists discovered phosphocreatine (creatine phosphate), and determined that creatine is a key player in the metabolism of skeletal muscle. The substance creatine is naturally formed in vertebrates.

The discovery of phosphocreatine was reported in 1927. In the 1960s, creatine kinase (CK) was shown to phosphorylate ADP using phosphocreatine (PCr) to generate ATP. It follows that ATP, not PCr is directly consumed in muscle contraction. CK uses creatine to "buffer" the ATP/ADP ratio.

While creatine's influence on physical performance has been well documented since the early twentieth century, it came into public view following the 1992 Olympics in Barcelona. An August 7, 1992 article in The Times reported that Linford Christie, the gold medal winner at 100 meters, had used creatine before the Olympics. An article in Bodybuilding Monthly named Sally Gunnell, who was the gold medalist in the 400-meter hurdles, as another creatine user. In addition, The Times also noted that 100 meter hurdler Colin Jackson began taking creatine before the Olympics.

At the time, low-potency creatine supplements were available in Britain, but creatine supplements designed for strength enhancement were not commercially available until 1993 when a company called Experimental and Applied Sciences (EAS) introduced the compound to the sports nutrition market under the name Phosphagen. Research performed thereafter demonstrated that the consumption of high glycemic carbohydrates in conjunction with creatine increases creatine muscle stores.

Metabolic role
Creatine is a naturally occurring non-protein compound and the primary constituent of phosphocreatine, which is used to regenerate ATP within the cell. 95% of the human body's total creatine and phosphocreatine stores are found in skeletal muscle, while the remainder is distributed in the blood, brain, testes, and other tissues. The typical creatine content of skeletal muscle (as both creatine and phosphocreatine) is 120 mmol per kilogram of dry muscle mass, but can reach up to 160 mmol/kg through supplementation. Approximately 1–2% of intramuscular creatine is degraded per day and an individual would need about 1–3 grams of creatine per day to maintain average (unsupplemented) creatine storage. An omnivorous diet provides roughly half of this value, with the remainder synthesized in the liver and kidneys.

Creatine is not an essential nutrient. It is an amino acid derivative, naturally produced in the human body from the amino acids glycine and arginine, with an additional requirement for S-Adenosyl methionine (a derivative of methionine) to catalyze the transformation of guanidinoacetate to creatine. In the first step of the biosynthesis, the enzyme arginine:glycine amidinotransferase (AGAT, EC:2.1.4.1) mediates the reaction of glycine and arginine to form guanidinoacetate. This product is then methylated by guanidinoacetate N-methyltransferase (GAMT, EC:2.1.1.2), using S-adenosyl methionine as the methyl donor. Creatine itself can be phosphorylated by creatine kinase to form phosphocreatine, which is used as an energy buffer in skeletal muscles and the brain. A cyclic form of creatine, called creatinine, exists in equilibrium with its tautomer and with creatine.

Phosphocreatine system

Creatine is transported through the blood and taken up by tissues with high energy demands, such as the brain and skeletal muscle, through an active transport system. The concentration of ATP in skeletal muscle is usually 2–5 mM, which would result in a muscle contraction of only a few seconds. During times of increased energy demands, the phosphagen (or ATP/PCr) system rapidly resynthesizes ATP from ADP with the use of phosphocreatine (PCr) through a reversible reaction catalysed by the enzyme creatine kinase (CK). The phosphate group is attached to an NH center of the creatine. In skeletal muscle, PCr concentrations may reach 20–35 mM or more. Additionally, in most muscles, the ATP regeneration capacity of CK is very high and is therefore not a limiting factor. Although the cellular concentrations of ATP are small, changes are difficult to detect because ATP is continuously and efficiently replenished from the large pools of PCr and CK. A proposed representation has been illustrated by Krieder et al. Creatine has the ability to increase muscle stores of PCr, potentially increasing the muscle's ability to resynthesize ATP from ADP to meet increased energy demands.

Creatine supplementation appears to increase the number of myonuclei that satellite cells will 'donate' to damaged muscle fibers, which increases the potential for growth of those fibers. This increase in myonuclei probably stems from creatine's ability to increase levels of the myogenic transcription factor MRF4.

Genetic deficiencies
Genetic deficiencies in the creatine biosynthetic pathway lead to various severe neurological defects. Clinically, there are three distinct disorders of creatine metabolism. Deficiencies in the two synthesis enzymes can cause L-arginine:glycine amidinotransferase deficiency caused by variants in GATM and guanidinoacetate methyltransferase deficiency, caused by variants in GAMT. Both biosynthetic defects are inherited in an autosomal recessive manner. A third defect, creatine transporter defect, is caused by mutations in SLC6A8 and inherited in a X-linked manner. This condition is related to the transport of creatine into the brain.

Vegetarians
Some studies suggest that total muscle creatine is significantly lower in vegetarians than non-vegetarians. It is postulated that this finding is due to an omnivorous diet being the primary source of creatine. Research shows that supplementation is needed to raise the concentration of creatine in the muscles of lacto-ovo vegetarians and vegans up to non-vegetarian levels.
Studies have shown that they have lower creatine concentrations in muscle and blood, but not brain.

Pharmacokinetics
Most of the research to-date on creatine has predominantly focused on the pharmacological properties of creatine, yet there is a lack of research into the pharmacokinetics of creatine. Studies have not established pharmacokinetic parameters for clinical usage of creatine such as volume of distribution, clearance, bioavailability, mean residence time, absorption rate, and half life. A clear pharmacokinetic profile would need to be established prior to optimal clinical dosing.

Dosing

Loading phase 

An approximation of 0.3 g/kg/day divided into 4 equal spaced intervals has been suggested since creatine needs may vary based on body weight. It has also been shown that taking a lower dose of 3 grams a day for 28 days can also increase total muscle creatine storage to the same amount as the rapid loading dose of 20 g/day for 6 days. However, a 28 day loading phase does not allow for ergogenic benefits of creatine supplementation to be realized until fully saturated muscle storage.

Supplementing creatine with carbohydrates or carbohydrates and protein has been shown to augment creatine retention.

This elevation in muscle creatine storage has been correlated with ergogenic benefits discussed in the research section. However, higher doses for longer periods of time are being studied to offset creatine synthesis deficiencies and mitigating diseases.

Maintenance phase 
After the 5–7 day loading phase, muscle creatine stores are fully saturated and supplementation only needs to cover the amount of creatine broken down per day. This maintenance dose was originally reported to be around 2–3 g/day (or 0.03 g/kg/day), however, some studies have suggested 3–5 g/day maintenance dose to maintain saturated muscle creatine.

Absorption 

Endogenous serum or plasma creatine concentrations in healthy adults are normally in a range of 2–12 mg/L. A single 5 gram (5000 mg) oral dose in healthy adults results in a peak plasma creatine level of approximately 120 mg/L at 1–2 hours post-ingestion. Creatine has a fairly short elimination half life, averaging just less than 3 hours, so to maintain an elevated plasma level it would be necessary to take small oral doses every 3–6 hours throughout the day.

Clearance 
It has been shown that once supplementation of creatine stops, muscle creatine stores return to baseline in 4–6 weeks.

Exercise and sport
Creatine supplements are marketed in ethyl ester, gluconate, monohydrate, and nitrate forms.

Creatine supplementation for sporting performance enhancement is considered safe for short-term use but there is a lack of safety data for long term use, or for use in children and adolescents.

A 2018 review article in the Journal of the International Society of Sports Nutrition said that creatine monohydrate might help with energy availability for high-intensity exercise.

Creatine use can increase maximum power and performance in high-intensity anaerobic repetitive work (periods of work and rest) by 5% to 15%. Creatine has no significant effect on aerobic endurance, though it will increase power during short sessions of high-intensity aerobic exercise.

A survey of 21,000 college athletes showed that 14% of athletes take creatine supplements to try to improve performance. Non-athletes report taking creatine supplements to improve appearance.

Research

Cognitive performance

Creatine is reported to have a beneficial effect on brain function and cognitive processing, although the evidence is difficult to interpret systematically and the appropriate dosing is unknown. The greatest effects appears to be in individuals who are stressed (due, for instance, to sleep deprivation) or cognitively impaired.

Muscular disease
A meta-analysis found that creatine treatment increased muscle strength in muscular dystrophies, and potentially improved functional performance. Creatine treatment does not appear to improve muscle strength in people who have metabolic myopathies. High doses of creatine lead to increased muscle pain and an impairment in activities of daily living when taken by people who have McArdle disease.

According to a clinical study focusing on people with various muscular dystrophies, using a pure form of creatine monohydrate can be beneficial in rehabilitation after injuries and immobilization.

Mitochondrial diseases

Parkinson's disease
Creatine's impact on mitochondrial function has led to research on its efficacy and safety for slowing Parkinson's disease. As of 2014, the evidence did not provide a reliable foundation for treatment decisions, due to risk of bias, small sample sizes, and the short duration of trials.

Huntington's disease 
Several primary studies have been completed but no systematic review on Huntington's disease has been completed yet.

ALS
It is ineffective as a treatment for amyotrophic lateral sclerosis.

Adverse effects
Side effects include:

 Weight gain due to extra water retention to the muscle
 Potential muscle cramps / strains / pulls
 Upset stomach
 Diarrhea
 Dizziness

One well-documented effect of creatine supplementation is weight gain within the first week of the supplement schedule, likely attributable to greater water retention due to the increased muscle creatine concentrations by means of osmosis.

A 2009 systematic review discredited concerns that creatine supplementation could affect hydration status and heat tolerance and lead to muscle cramping and diarrhea.

Renal function 
A 2019 systematic review published by the National Kidney Foundation investigated whether creatine supplementation had adverse effects on renal function. They identified 15 studies from 1997–2013 that looked at standard creatine loading and maintenance protocols of 4–20 g/day of creatine versus placebo. They utilized serum creatinine, creatinine clearance, and serum urea levels as a measure of renal damage. While in general creatine supplementation resulted in slightly elevated creatinine levels that remained within normal limits, supplementation did not induce renal damage (P value< 0.001). Special populations included in the 2019 Systematic review included type 2 diabetic patients and post-menopausal women, bodybuilders, athletes, and resistance trained populations. The study also discussed 3 case studies where there were reports that creatine affected renal function.

In a joint statement between the American College of Sports Medicine, Academy of Nutrition and Dietetics, and Dietitians in Canada on performance enhancing nutrition strategies, creatine was included in their list of ergogenic aids and they do not list renal function as a concern for use.

The most recent position stand on creatine from the Journal of International Society of Sports Nutrition states that creatine is safe to take in healthy populations from infants to the elderly to performance athletes. They also state that long term (5 years) use of creatine has been considered safe.

It is important to mention that kidneys themselves, for normal physiological function, need phosphocreatine and creatine and indeed kidneys express significant amounts of creatine kinases (BB-CK and u-mtCK isoenzymes). At the same time, the first of two steps for endogenous creatine synthesis takes place in the kidneys themselves. Patients with kidney disease and those undergoing dialysis treatment generally show significantly lower levels of creatine in their organs, since the pathological kidneys are both hampered in creatine synthesis capability and are in back-resorption of creatine from the urine in the distal tubules. In addition, dialysis patients lose creatine due to wash out by the dialysis treatment itself and thus become chronically creatine depleted. This situation is exacerbated by the fact that dialysis patients generally consume less meat and fish, the alimentary sources of creatine. Therefore, to alleviate chronic creatine depletion in these patients and allow organs to replenish their stores of creatine, it was recently proposed to supplement dialysis patients with extra creatine, preferably by intra-dialytic administration. Such a supplementation with creatine in dialysis patients is expected to significantly improve the health and quality of the patients by improving muscle strength, coordination of movement, brain function and to alleviate depression and chronic fatigue that are common in these patients.

Safety

Contamination

A 2011 survey of 33 supplements commercially available in Italy found that over 50% of them exceeded the European Food Safety Authority recommendations in at least one contaminant. The most prevalent of these contaminants was creatinine, a breakdown product of creatine also produced by the body. Creatinine was present in higher concentrations than the European Food Safety Authority recommendations in 44% of the samples. About 15% of the samples had detectable levels of dihydro-1,3,5-triazine or a high dicyandiamide concentration. Heavy metals contamination was not found to be a concern, with only minor levels of mercury being detectable. Two studies reviewed in 2007 found no impurities.

Interactions 
Creatine taken with medications that can harm the kidney can increase the risk of kidney damage:

Nonsteroidal anti-inflammatory drugs (NSAIDs) – some examples are ibuprofen (Motrin, Advil) and naproxen (Aleve)
Diuretics (water pills) – an example is furosemide (Lasix)
Cimetidine (Tagamet)
Probenicid

A National Institutes of Health study suggests that caffeine interacts with creatine to increase the rate of progression of Parkinson's Disease.

Food and cooking 
When creatine is mixed with protein and sugar at high temperatures (above 148 ℃), the resulting reaction produces carcinogenic heterocyclic amines (HCAs). Such a reaction happens when grilling or pan-frying meat. Creatine content (as a percentage of crude protein) can be used as an indicator of meat quality.

Dietary considerations 
Creatine-monohydrate is suitable for vegetarians and vegans, as the raw materials used for the production of the supplement have no animal origin.

See also 
 Beta-Alanine
 Creatine methyl ester

References

External links 

 Creatine bound to proteins in the PDB

Amino acids
Bodybuilding supplements
Dietary supplements
Ergogenic aids
Guanidines
Myostatin inhibitors